The Honor of the Queen is a science fiction novel by American writer David Weber, first published in 1993. It is the second book in the Honor Harrington series. In the story, Honor is dispatched to the world "Grayson," where she finds that the society on the planet is religiously conservative and discriminatory against women. This proves to be a challenge to her due to her mission as a diplomat to establish good relations. However, Honor must find a way to rally the people of Grayson under her cause in preparation for the inevitable war with Haven.

Plot summary 

Three years after the events in On Basilisk Station, Captain Honor Harrington returns to the Star Kingdom after a long anti-piracy campaign in the Silesian Confederacy. While her ship, HMS Fearless, has her first refit, new orders arrive. Fearless is tasked to lead a small Manticoran squadron supporting a diplomatic mission to the planet Grayson, a planet ruled by a heavily sexist and patriarchal society, due in part to its fundamentalist Christian and Luddite history, as well as its brutally hostile environment. The diplomatic mission is to be led by Admiral Raoul Courvosier, Honor's mentor and personal friend. With the long-awaited war with Haven looming close, Manticore is working to form an Alliance with many small nations. Grayson is critical to this effort, as it would close a flank of advance for a possible Havenite invasion fleet. Adding to the pressure, Haven is negotiating its own alliance with Masada, Grayson's historical rival.

The Manticoran ships arrive at Yeltsin's Star, the system where Grayson is located, and are greeted by the small Grayson Navy. However, the welcome is soured by sexism in the Graysons, for whom the notion of a woman in uniform is intolerable. After several hostile confrontations, Honor leaves the system to escort a convoy of freighters, believing her presence is souring the negotiations, even though Courvosier tries to convince her not to do so.

After Honor leaves with three of the four Manticoran warships sent to Grayson, Admiral Courvosier meets with Admiral Bernard Yanakov (the commander of the Grayson Navy), and the officers begin to work their way through their cultural differences, earning some sympathy and respect for each other's point of view.  Everything is cut short when a Masadan fleet approaches Grayson and begins attacking space stations throughout the system. Admiral Courvosier accepts Yanakov's offer to join his fleet in chasing the Masadans, not knowing that the Masadans possess two Havenite warships under Captain Alfredo Yu and Cmdr. Thomas Theisman, "bought" from Haven but reporting to Masadan command.  This fleet makes quick work of Grayson's outdated defenders, not to mention the Manticoran destroyer Madrigal, leading to the deaths of both Courvosier and Yanakov.

Honor's ships return to Grayson and are attacked by Masadan light attack craft, which damaged one of her ships. After entering Grayson's orbit, they are apprised of the critical situation following the battle and the death of Admiral Courvosier. Honor strong-arms Protector Benjamin into allowing her to take a leading role in the defense of Grayson. She also then defends him against Masadan assassins, losing one of her eyes, earning her a great deal of acclaim from the Grayson people.

Grayson soon learns that Masada has built an advanced base within Grayson's star system. Leading her ships and the remnants of the Grayson fleet, Honor defeats a group of Masadan warships, as well as the PNS Breslau, now fighting as the MNS Principality. Cmdr. Theisman is able to inflict significant damage on HMS Apollo, under Cmdr. Alice Truman, but is ultimately forced to surrender.  Once in confidence, he tells Honor that there are female POWs from Madrigal at the base and that he suspects they are being ill-treated.  An assault by Fearless Marines follows, and the Masadan base is captured, finding most of the prisoners executed and all the female prisoners horrifically brutalized, with Honor nearly performing an on-the-spot execution of the Masadan commander.

On Masada, the Havenite "advisers" see that Masada's bid to conquer Grayson is doomed and try to pull out. However, the Masadans find out and seize control of the Saladin, which they have renamed Thunder of God.  Captain Yu catches wind of the mutiny and pulls as many Havenite crew off the ship as he can, leaving the Masadan fanatics in ownership of a Sultan-class battle cruiser that outguns Honor's remaining ships.

Honor dispatches Apollo back to Manticore for reinforcements, while her Fearless and Alistair McKeon's Troubadour prepare to fight the Masadans. The Manticorans' superior tactical skills, and the Masadans' unfamiliarity with their ship, allow them to inflict much more damage on Thunder of God than they ought to have done, but Thunder of God by sheer weight of fire is able to destroy Troubadour and inflict equal damage on Fearless.  Manticoran reinforcements, summoned by Apollo and led by Admiral Hamish Alexander, Earl White Haven, arrive in-system, but neither Fearless nor Thunder of God are able to detect them due to damage to their radar and gravitic detection equipment. Despite knowing the outcome is hopeless, Honor commits Fearless against Thunder of God hoping to do enough damage to prevent Thunder from carpet bombing Grayson. In a desperate gamble, White Haven's fleet launches from beyond maximum range, distracting the Masadan crew at a crucial moment and allowing Fearless to deliver the killing blow.

With Grayson secured, a joint Manticore-Grayson fleet attacks Masada and occupies the planet.  Thomas Theisman is returned to Haven. The Havenite refugees from Saladin, led by Alfredo Yu, surrender to the Graysonites; several others defect, including Yu himself.  Honor recovers from the wounds sustained during the numerous battles and the attack on the Mayhew family, receiving a prosthetic eye. Protector Benjamin decorates her with the Star of Grayson and appoints her as Steadholder (governor) of a new fief on Grayson, allowing her to help Benjamin speed up his planned social reforms, a program which comes to be known as the "Mayhew Restoration."  Finally, the Manticoran government creates Honor a Countess and names her a Companion of the Knights of King George.

 The players 
The Star Kingdom of Manticore is the star nation that occupies the Manticore binary star system, a monarchy. The current ruler is Queen Elizabeth III of the House of Winton. The binary Manticore System was located 512 light-years to the Galactic north of the Sol System and Earth. It contained three habitable planets: Gryphon, Sphinx, and the capital planet Manticore. The Star Kingdom was a single-system nation. From the 19th Century Post Diaspora (when humans left the Sol System) onwards it began to incorporate new systems for strategic reasons, mostly to control the termini of the Manticore Wormhole Junction and the possibility of war with The People's Republic of Haven.Crown of Slaves, David Weber, 2003

The People's Republic of Haven is trying to counter the Manticoran Alliance by aiding the Masadans and throwing a potential alliance between Manticore and Grayson off-balance. The Havenites know that Masada is not a reliable ally, but they accept it for the moment. Unlike Manticore, they keep very well hidden to the Masadans that they treat their women as equals.

The Protectorate of Grayson is desperate for foreign aid to sustain its growing industrial base and technological development, as well as to end their conflict with Masada, a conflict on which diplomacy is impossible. Manticore is more reliable for the Grayson leaders (who also want to modernize their society) than the voracious People's Republic.Masada has just one goal: to conquer Grayson and restore the "true Faith" to their original world. In the eyes of the Masadan leadership, an alliance with Haven is nothing more than a provisional deal with a bunch of "infidels", a deal from which both sides may get benefits, but nothing more than that.

 The characters 

 Manticorans HMS Fearless Honor Harrington - Captain of the List, Royal Manticoran Navy The commanding officer of Fearless and virtual commander of the small Manticoran squadron sent to Grayson. She takes over and organizes the defense of Grayson following the first devastating engagement between Grayson and Masada.
 Nimitz Honor Harrington's treecat. During the novel, Nimitz and Honor develop an empathic link between the two of them, allowing Honor to sense the emotions of others.
 Andreas Venizelos - Commander, Royal Manticoran Navy Fearless executive officer.
 Rafael Cardones - Lieutenant Commander, Royal Manticoran Navy Tactical officer on board Fearless.
 Carolyn Wolcott - Ensign, Royal Manticoran Navy Junior officer serving under Lt. Commander Cardones at Tactical.
 Tomas Ramirez - Major, Royal Manticoran Marine Corps Commander of the Marine detachment on board Fearless.
 Iris Babcock - Sergeant Major, Royal Manticoran Marine Corps Fearless senior Marine non-commissioned officer or "Gunny".HMS Apollo
 Alice Truman - Commander, Royal Manticoran Navy Commanding officer of the light cruiser HMS Apollo. During the novel, she sets a speed record during her transit between Yeltsin's Star and Manticore to warn the Manticoran Admiralty of the situation in Grayson.HMS Troubadour Alistair McKeon - Commander, Royal Manticoran Navy Honor's former XO on the old Fearless, now in command of his own destroyer.HMS Madrigal Jason Alvarez - Commander, Royal Manticoran Navy Commanding officer of the destroyer Madrigal. Survived the destruction of Madrigal after the first battle with the Masadans, but was later tortured and killed by his captors at Blackbird Base.
 Mercedes Brigham - Lieutenant Commander, Royal Manticoran Navy'''
 Executive Officer of HMS Madrigal. Also survived after the destruction of her ship. Suffered torture and rape at the hands of her Masadan captors before being rescued by Fearless Marines.
 Mai-Ling Jackson - Ensign, Royal Manticoran Navy Another survivor of Madrigal. Together with Mercedes Brigham, she is one of only two female survivors captured by the Masadans. The other women captured were systematically raped and murdered, inflicting a violent trauma upon Ensign Jackson.Diplomatic mission to Grayson Raoul Courvosier - Admiral of the Green, Royal Manticoran Navy One of the most recognized tacticians of his time, former instructor at Saganami Naval Academy and mentor to Honor Harrington. Dies on board Madrigal while fighting the Masadans.
 Reginald Houseman Admiral Courvosier's second-in-command within the diplomatic mission. A leading theorist of the Liberal Party who is convinced that the military is little more than a bunch of ignorant warmongers. Advocated leaving Grayson to its own fortune and was physically struck by Captain Harrington after illegally ordering her to leave the system.
 Sir Anthony Langtry Manticore's ambassador to Grayson.

 Graysons 

 Benjamin Mayhew IX Planetary Protector (head of state) of Grayson. Educated at Harvard University's Bogotá Campus on Earth and a reformist who wishes to integrate Grayson with the rest of the Galaxy.
 Bernard Yanakov - High Admiral, Grayson Space Navy The commanding officer of the Grayson Navy. Died on board the light cruiser Austin Grayson during the first battle with the Masadans.
 Howard Clinkscales Grayson's Minister of Security and one of the planet's staunchest conservatives, although he comes to respect Honor Harrington after she saves the lives of Protector Benjamin and his family.
 Wesley Matthews - Captain (later Admiral) - Grayson Space Navy Commander of the light cruiser Covington, which survives the first battle with the Masadans. Later goes on to command what remains of the Grayson Navy.
 Mark Brentworth - Commander, Grayson Space Navy A Grayson officer assigned as liaison between Captain Harrington and the Grayson Space Navy.
 Michael Mayhew Protector Benjamin's brother and heir to the Protectorship.
 Jared Mayhew (a.k.a. "Maccabeus") Grayson's Minister of Industry and secretly a leader of the Maccabeans, a secret society aimed at reunifying Grayson and Masada and cleansing Grayson of its "apostasy".

 Havenites 
 Alfredo Yu - Captain, People's Navy Commanding officer of the battlecruiser PNS Saladin, renamed MNS Thunder of God after its "acquisition" by Masada. Captain Yu was given a commission within the Masadan Navy as Captain until the Masadans were ready to crew the ship. Defects to Manticore after being betrayed by the Masadans.
 Thomas Theisman - Commander, People's Navy Commanding officer of the destroyer PNS Breslau, renamed MNS Principality after its "acquisition" by Masada. Captured by Honor Harrington following the surrender of his ship; he then reveals that the Masadans were torturing the survivors of Madrigal.

 Masadans 
 Matthew Simonds - Sword of the Faithful, Masadan Navy The commander of the entire Masadan military and leader of the assaults on Grayson. Brother of Chief Elder Simonds
 Thomas Simonds Chief Elder of the Church of Humanity Unchained and the head of state of Masada.
 (first name unknown) Williams - Captain, Masadan Navy Commander of Blackbird Base. Hanged by the Graysons for war crimes.
 Ronald Sands Deacon of the Church of Humanity Unchained and head of Masadan Intelligence.
 Ernst Franks - Admiral, Masadan Navy' Senior commander of the Masadan fleet.

References

 External links 
 The complete text of The Honor of the Queen'' is available for download or reading online at the Baen Free Library here.

1993 American novels
1993 science fiction novels
American science fiction novels
Religion in science fiction
Novels by David Weber
Honorverse books
Baen Books available as e-books